François-Léon Sicard (April 21, 1862 – July 8, 1934) was a French sculptor in the late 19th and early 20th century. His credits include work on the adornments of the Louvre, and numerous sculptures around the world.

Sicard was born in Tours, studied with Louis-Ernest Barrias, and is known for his lithography and his fiercely patriotic original works of art. Despite the prolific populace of noted works throughout Europe, surprisingly little is known about Sicard himself. His work is very similar to that of Gustave Crauk (1827–1920) and Antoine-Augustin Préault (1809–1879), and he may have worked in collaboration with Crauk on some of his sculptures during the early 20th century.

Notable works

Some of his noted sculptures include:

 Le Bon Samaritain (The Good Samaritan), Grand Carré of the Tuileries, Tuileries Gardens, Paris, 1896
 four atlantes for the Hôtel de Ville, Tours, for architect Victor Laloux, c. 1900
 Autel de la Convention nationale ("Monument to the National Convention") or Autel républicain, Panthéon de Paris, 1913
 the Archibald Fountain in Hyde Park, Sydney, Australia, completed in France 1926, unveiled on site 1932
 work at the Cercle National des Armées, Paris, for architect Charles Lemaresquier, 1927 
 Oedipe et le Sphinx (Oedipus and the Sphinx)

Gallery

References 

 Daniel Cady Eaton, A Handbook of Modern French Sculpture, Dodd, Mead and Company, 1913, pages 273–274.

External links

 

1862 births
1934 deaths
Prix de Rome for sculpture
Members of the Académie des beaux-arts
20th-century French sculptors
19th-century French sculptors
French male sculptors
19th-century French male artists